Union Township is one of the 25 townships of Licking County, Ohio, United States. As of the 2010 census the population was 8,783, of whom 3,702 lived in the unincorporated portions of the township.

Geography
Located on the southern edge of the county, it borders the following townships and city:
 Granville Township - north
 Newark - northeast
 Heath - northeast
 Licking Township - east
 Thorn Township, Perry County - southeast corner
 Buckeye Lake - southeast
 Walnut Township, Fairfield County - south
 Liberty Township, Fairfield County - southwest corner
 Harrison Township - west
 St. Albans Township - northwest corner

Several municipalities are located in Union Township:
 Part of the village of Buckeye Lake, in the southeast
 The village of Hebron, in the east

Name and history
It is one of 27 Union Townships statewide.

Government
The township is governed by a three-member board of trustees, who are elected in November of odd-numbered years to a four-year term beginning on the following January 1. Two are elected in the year after the presidential election and one is elected in the year before it. There is also an elected township fiscal officer, who serves a four-year term beginning on April 1 of the year after the election, which is held in November of the year before the presidential election. Vacancies in the fiscal officership or on the board of trustees are filled by the remaining trustees.

References

External links
 
 County website

Townships in Licking County, Ohio
Townships in Ohio